"Hey Ladies" is a song by American hip hop group the Beastie Boys, featured on their album Paul's Boutique. It was the album's only charting single, hitting #36 on the Billboard Hot 100. It is also the first single in history to chart in the Top 20 of both the Billboard Hot Rap Singles and Modern Rock Tracks charts, hitting #10 on the former and #18 on the latter.

Cash Box said  that "This is extremely funky, and way catchy."

The 12" record and CD versions of the single were released as an EP entitled Love American Style.

A music video, in the vein of Saturday Night Fever and the Dolemite series of blaxploitation films, was made for the song.

Track listings
7" single
 "Hey Ladies" – 3:54
 "Shake Your Rump" – 3:18

Love American Style EP
 "Hey Ladies" – 3:47
 "Shake Your Rump" – 3:19
 "33% God" – 3:40
 "Dis Yourself in '89 (Just Do It)" – 3:26

Samples
The sources of the song's samples can be found on WhoSampled.
 "The Ballroom Blitz" by Sweet
 "Party Time" by Kurtis Blow
 "Holy Ghost" by the Bar-Kays
 "Shake Your Pants" and "I Just Want to Be" by Cameo
 "Pumpin' It Up" by P-Funk All Stars
 "Jungle Boogie" by Kool & the Gang
 "Machine Gun" by The Commodores
 "Jazzy Sensation" by Afrika Bambaataa
 "Change Le Beat" by Fab 5 Freddy featuring Beeside
 "Come Let Me Love You" by Jeanette "Lady" Day
 "So Ruff, So Tuff" by Zapp & Roger
 "Ain't It Funky Now" and "Funky President" by James Brown
 "Hey DJ" by Malcolm McLaren and the World Famous Supreme Team
 "High Power Rap" by Crash Crew
 "Hush" by Deep Purple

Charts

References

Beastie Boys songs
1989 singles
Capitol Records singles
1989 songs
Songs written by Larry Troutman
Songs written by Roger Troutman
Songs written by Ad-Rock
Songs written by Mike D
Songs written by Adam Yauch
Songs written by Garry Shider
Song recordings produced by Dust Brothers
Songs written by John King (record producer)
Songs written by Michael Simpson (producer)